The Vallée de Joux is a valley of the Jura Mountains mainly in the Swiss Canton of Vaud. The valley also continues into France (Jura département) at its higher, southwestern, end. The valley then continues to climb gently towards the Lac des Rousses and the ski resort of Les Rousses.

The NE-SW orientation, and the  altitude combine to make for an especially cold winter climate. Indeed, the valley is sometimes called the Vaud Siberia. The coldest weather arises when the Bise wind, which comes from the North-East, is blowing.

There are three main municipalities in the valley, le Chenit, le Lieu and l'Abbaye, all part of the Jura-Nord vaudois District. These include ten villages, such as Le Sentier, Le Brassus, Le Lieu and Le Pont.

The Vallée de Joux is, along with Neuchâtel, the birthplace of Swiss horology and it is still the home of the most famous Swiss watch factories, like Audemars Piguet, Blancpain, Breguet, Patek Philippe, Vacheron Constantin and  Jaeger-LeCoultre.

Ski area 
The Vallée de Joux hosts four ski resorts, a common forfeitary offer is available:

Dent de Vaulion (2 ski-lifts);
L'Abbey (4 ski-lifts);
L'Orient (3 ski-lifts);
Le Brassus (2 ski-lifts).

Vallée de Joux is the largest ski area in the Swiss Jura.

Further reading
Reymond, Lucien ; Notice sur la vallée du Lac de Joux, 1864 ; Les Charbonnières : Le Pèlerin, 1995. 
 Devicque, Julien-Hippolyte and  Rochat, Rémy ; Merveilleuse vallée du Lac-de-Joux ; Les Charbonnières : Editions Le Pèlerin, 1992.

References

External links

Valleys of Switzerland
Landforms of the canton of Vaud